Chrząstawa may refer to:

Chrząstawa River
Chrząstawa (city) (Gmina Widawa, Łask County, Lodz Voivodeship)
Chrząstawa, Łódź Voivodeship (central Poland)

Two places in Gmina Czernica, Poland
Chrząstawa Mała
Chrząstawa Wielka